NXT Deadline (stylized as DEADL1NE) was a  professional wrestling livestreaming event produced by WWE. It was held primarily for wrestlers from the promotion's NXT brand division. The event took place on Saturday, December 10, 2022, at the WWE Performance Center in Orlando, Florida. Deadline replaced NXT WarGames as the brand's December event, as the WarGames concept was moved to the main roster for that year's Survivor Series event for the Raw and SmackDown brands. Additionally, Deadline debuted the Iron Survivor Challenge match-type in WWE, with one each for the men and women.

Seven matches were contested at the event, including two dark matches that were later streamed on Level Up. In the main event, Bron Breakker defeated Apollo Crews to retain the NXT Championship. For the event's Iron Survivor Challenges, Grayson Waller won the men's, while the women's, which was the opening bout, was won by Roxanne Perez. In another notable match, SmackDown's The New Day (Kofi Kingston and Xavier Woods) defeated Pretty Deadly (Elton Prince and Kit Wilson) to win the NXT Tag Team Championship for the first time, becoming the third WWE Tag Team Triple Crown Champions. This also marked their record 12th WWE-branded tag team championship as a team, and Kingston's record 15th WWE-branded tag team title individually. 

The event received positive reviews, with critics praising both Iron Survivor matches, but were very critical of the Isla Dawn vs. Alba Fyre match.

Production

Background
On October 15, 2022, the American professional wrestling promotion WWE filed to trademark the name "NXT Deadline" for their developmental brand, NXT. During a media conference on October 21 the night before NXT Halloween Havoc, WWE executive Shawn Michaels confirmed that NXT's next livestreaming event would be Deadline. It was scheduled to be held on Saturday, December 10 at NXT's home venue, the WWE Performance Center in Orlando, Florida, and aired on Peacock in the United States and the WWE Network in international markets. Deadline replaced NXT WarGames as the brand's December event, after the WarGames concept was moved to the main roster for the 2022 Survivor Series for the Raw and SmackDown brands.

Storylines

The card included matches that resulted from scripted storylines, where wrestlers portrayed heroes, villains, or less distinguishable characters in scripted events that built tension and culminated in a wrestling match or series of matches. Results were predetermined by WWE's writers on the NXT brand, while storylines were produced on the weekly television program, NXT, and the supplementary online streaming show, Level Up.

On the November 15 episode of NXT, WWE executive Shawn Michaels announced a new match format for WWE called the Iron Survivor Challenge, which would occur at Deadline, with one each for the men and women. The rules are as follows:

Five wrestlers compete in the match, which lasts 25 minutes.
Two wrestlers start the match, which begins the timer, and every five minutes, another wrestler enters with the fifth and final participant entering at the 15-minute mark. 
Each time a wrestler scores a pinfall, submission, or being the victim of a disqualification, they gain a point. Points can be gained even before other participants have entered.
A wrestler who is pinned, submitted, or is disqualified goes into a penalty box for 90 seconds. 
The winner of the match, dubbed the Iron Survivor, is the wrestler who scores the most points at the end of the 25-minute time limit. In the result of a tie, those who are tied enter sudden death overtime.
The winners of the men's and women's matches become the number one contenders for the NXT Championship and NXT Women's Championship, respectively.

On the November 29 episode of NXT, the first four contestants for the men's Iron Survivor Challenge were revealed as Carmelo Hayes, JD McDonagh, Grayson Waller, and Joe Gacy, while for the women's match, Zoey Stark, Cora Jade, Roxanne Perez, and Kiana James were revealed as the first four participants. The following week, Axiom won the fifth and final spot in the men's match by defeating Von Wagner and Andre Chase in a triple threat match, while Indi Hartwell won the fifth and final spot in the women's by defeating Wendy Choo and Fallon Henley, also in a triple threat match.

On the November 15 episode of NXT, Apollo Crews warned NXT Champion Bron Breakker that his goal was to become champion. Later, after Crews' match, Breakker appeared to confront him. The following week, Breakker was scheduled to defend the NXT Championship against Crews at Deadline.

On the December 6 episode of NXT, while NXT Tag Team Champions Pretty Deadly (Elton Prince and Kit Wilson) were reading a Christmas story, they were interrupted by SmackDown roster members The New Day (Kofi Kingston and Xavier Woods), who attacked the duo and challenged them for the titles. The match was made official for Deadline.

On the November 15 episode of NXT, Alba Fyre lost her NXT Women's Championship match thanks to interference from Isla Dawn, who made her NXT debut. On the December 6 episode, Fyre attacked Dawn after the latter's match. Later that night, a match between Fyre and Dawn was made official for Deadline.

Event

Dark matches
Before the event went live, two dark matches took place that would later stream on the December 16 episode of Level Up. In the first, Ivy Nile (with Tatum Paxley) defeated Lash Legend, while in the second, Chase University (Andre Chase and Duke Hudson) (with Thea Hail) defeated the team of Javier Bernal and Xyon Quinn.

Preliminary matches
The actual event began with the women's Iron Survivor Challenge, featuring Indi Hartwell, Cora Jade, Kiana James, Roxanne Perez, and Zoey Stark as the five participants. Perez and Stark were the first two entrants. James entered third. Stark performed a K-360 on Perez to score the first point. Jade entered fourth. Perez attempted Pop Rocks on James, but Jade tossed Perez aside and performed a Superkick on James to score a point. Hartwell entered last and pinned Perez after a big boot to score a point. Perez pinned Stark with a roll-up to score a point. Perez performed Pop Rocks on Jade to bring herself in the lead. In the end, Jade performed a DDT on Perez, who rolled out of the ring as the time expired. As a result, Perez won the match with two points, and was named the women's Iron Survivor.

In the second match, Alba Fyre took on Isla Dawn. In the end, Fyre performed a Swanton Bomb, but the referee coughed up black goo. Dawn took advantage by shoving Fyre into an exposed turnbuckle, and then performed the Eye of the Hurricane to win the match.

In the third match, Pretty Deadly (Kit Wilson and Elton Prince) defended the NXT Tag Team Championship against The New Day (Kofi Kingston and Xavier Woods). During the match, all four competitors tossed one of the title belts to the other to pretend that they were hit by them, in an homage to Eddie Guerrero. In the climax, Wilson and Prince attempted Spilt Milk on Woods, but Kingston pulled Wilson out of the ring and performed Trouble in Paradise. Kingston and Woods then performed the Midnight Hour on Prince to win the titles for the first time, making them the third WWE Tag Team Triple Crown Champions. This also marked their record 12th WWE-branded tag team championship as a team, and record 15th WWE-branded tag team title for Kingston individually.

The penultimate match was the men's Iron Survivor Challenge, with Axiom, Joe Gacy, Carmelo Hayes, JD McDonagh, and Grayson Waller as the five participants. McDonagh, the first entrant, attacked Axiom, the second entrant, during the latter's entrance. The third entrant was Hayes, who pinned Axiom after suplexing McDonagh onto him to score the first point. The fourth entrant was Waller, who performed Ace Crushers on Axiom and McDonagh to pin both men and score two points. Axiom rolled up Waller to score a point, and performed the Golden Ratio on McDonagh to score another. The final entrant was Gacy, who forced Axiom to submit to the Rings of Saturn to score a point, and pinned Hayes after performing the Upside-Down World to score another. Hayes forced Waller to submit to a crossface to score another point. In the closing moments, Hayes performed a diving leg drop on Axiom, but Waller dragged Hayes out of the ring and pinned Axiom himself to score his third point. Waller then ran around the ring until the time expired, winning the match and being named the men's Iron Survivor.

Main event
In the main event, Bron Breakker defended the NXT Championship against Apollo Crews. This was an evenly contested match. At one point, Crews performed a Military Press Powerslam of his own on Breakker for a nearfall. In the end, Breakker performed a Spear on Crews to retain the title. After the match, Grayson Waller appeared and performed an Ace Crusher on Breakker. Waller then held the title over Breakker as the event ended.

Reception
Thomas Hall of 411Mania gave the event an 8.5 out of 10. He was critical of the twist ending during the Dawn-Fyre match but praised the rest of the card, highlighting the men's Iron Survivor Challenge for being the energetic "race against the clock" he hoped the women's Challenge would be (which he also found good). He concluded: "It's definitely not a Takeover, but for the new generation of NXT, this worked out very well ... Not a classic, but it's an easy watch with good stuff throughout and that's a nice way to go." Kevin Berge of Bleacher Report gave praise to the NXT Tag Title bout and men's Iron Survivor Challenge but was critical of the "deflating" finish to the Dawn-Fyre match and felt the NXT Championship main event came across as "a filler title defense for NXT television."

Aftermath
After Deadline, it was announced that Roxanne Perez and Grayson Waller would get their respective championship matches at NXT: New Year's Evil on January 10, 2023. On the following episode of NXT, however, NXT Women's Champion Mandy Rose attacked Perez. The women's title match was subsequently rescheduled for that episode's main event, where Perez defeated Rose to win the title for the first time, ending Rose's reign at 413 days. The next day, Rose was released from WWE due to violating the terms of her contract by posting explicit content on her FanTime page (a subscription website similar to OnlyFans).

Also on NXT, NXT Tag Team Champions The New Day (Kofi Kingston and Xavier Woods) celebrated their win at Deadline, only for Pretty Deadly (Kit Wilson and Elton Prince) to interrupt. Kingston and Woods told them that they would get another shot at the championship if they recited the Pledge of Allegiance. However, Josh Briggs and Brooks Jensen interrupted, and recited the pledge themselves. As a result, they became the number one contenders for the title. The match was scheduled for the December 20 episode, where Kingston and Woods retained. Prior to the match, Kingston and Woods agreed to give Wilson and Prince a rematch if they found everything on a list. On the January 3, 2023, episode, Wilson and Prince stated that at New Year's Evil, they would be competing in a gauntlet match against three other teams to determine the number one contenders for the NXT Tag Team Championship. At New Year's Evil, Pretty Deadly were the last team eliminated by a returning Gallus (Mark Coffey and Wolfgang). The following week, Pretty Deadly interrupted The New Day as they spoke in the ring, followed by Gallus, and then a brawl between the three teams, which led to Pretty Deadly being added to the match, turning it into a triple threat tag team match. The match was subsequently scheduled for Vengeance Day. On the January 24 episode, The New Day announced a tag team invitational for the following week's episode, where the winners would be added to the title match, turning it into a fatal four-way tag team match, which was won by Chase University (Andre Chase and Duke Hudson).

At New Year's Evil, Grayson Waller's match against Bron Breakker for the NXT Championship ended when the middle rope snapped, causing Waller to fall out of the ring and be counted out, allowing Breakker to retain the title. Due to the issue of the ropes, a Steel Cage match between the two for the title was subsequently scheduled for Vengeance Day.

An Extreme Resolution match between Alba Fyre and Isla Dawn was scheduled for the January 3, 2023, episode of NXT, where Fyre was victorious. On the January 17 episode, Fyre lost to Sol Ruca due to a distraction from Dawn. The following week, Fyre and Ruca failed to win the NXT Women's Tag Team Championship due to another distraction from Dawn. On the January 31 episode, Fyre sided with Dawn, thus turning heel in the process.

Results

Women's Iron Survivor Challenge statistics

Men's Iron Survivor Challenge statistics

References

External links 
 

2022 WWE Network events
December 2022 events in the United States
WWE NXT
2022 in professional wrestling in Florida
Events in Orlando, Florida
Professional wrestling in Orlando, Florida